

Incumbents
President of Benin: Patrice Talon

Events
Ongoing – COVID-19 pandemic in Benin
5 February – Twenty people, including incumbent President Patrice Talon, enroll as candidates in the 2021 Beninese presidential election. Talon's running mate, Mariam Chabi Talata, would be Benin′s first female vice president if elected.
1-2 December - Porga attack

Scheduled events

11 April – 2021 Beninese presidential election

Deaths

See also 
2021 in West Africa

References

 
Benin
Benin 
2020s in Benin
Years of the 21st century in Benin